Laura A. Brown, nee Penn (1874–1924) was an American activist and local politician. She was the first African-American to run for the state legislature in Pennsylvania.

Personal life
Brown was born Laura Penn on November 8, 1874, in Gettysburg, Pennsylvania. She married George Brown at a young age. They lived in Pittsburgh, Pennsylvania and had one daughter.

Public life
Brown was an active member of the Pennsylvania Federation of Colored Women's Clubs and her church choir.

During World War I, Brown led a war savings stamp campaign that allowed individual citizens to help fund the U.S. war effort. Later, during Warren G. Harding's presidential campaign, Brown became a member of the executive board of the Republican Women's Committee of Allegheny County and the Republican Council of Women of the City-County Federation of Allegheny.

In 1922, Brown became the first African-American to run for state legislature in Pennsylvania as a candidate for the First District in Allegheny County. She did not win election.

References

1874 births
1924 deaths
Pennsylvania Republicans
People from Gettysburg, Pennsylvania
Politicians from Pittsburgh
African-American women in politics
20th-century African-American people
20th-century African-American women